Kaoru Moto (April 25, 1917 – August 26, 1992) was a United States Army soldier. He was posthumously awarded the United States military's highest decoration—the Medal of Honor—for his actions in World War II.

Early life 
Moto was born in Hawaii to Japanese immigrant parents. He is a Nisei, which means that he is a second generation Japanese-American.

Soldier
Ten months before the Japanese attack on Pearl Harbor, he joined the US Army in March 1941.

Moto volunteered to be part of the all-Nisei 100th Infantry Battalion.  This army unit was mostly made up of Japanese Americans from Hawaii and the mainland.

On July 7, 1944, Moto was serving as a private first class in the 100th Infantry Battalion. On that day, near Castellina Marittima, Italy, he single-handedly silenced two enemy machine gun positions while acting as a scout, and then destroyed a third despite being seriously wounded. For his actions in battle, he was awarded the Army's second-highest decoration, the Distinguished Service Cross.

Moto left the Army while still a private first class. He died at age 75 and was buried at the National Memorial Cemetery of the Pacific in Honolulu, Hawaii.

A 1990s review of service records for Asian Americans who received the Distinguished Service Cross during World War II led to Moto's award being upgraded to the Medal of Honor. In a ceremony at the White House on June 21, 2000, his surviving family was presented with his Medal of Honor by President Bill Clinton. Twenty-one other Asian Americans also received the medal during the ceremony, all but seven of them posthumously.

Medal of Honor recipient
Moto's official Medal of Honor citation reads:
Private First Class Kaoru Moto distinguished himself by extraordinary heroism in action on 7 July 1944, near Castellina, Italy. While serving as first scout, Private First Class Moto observed a machine gun nest that was hindering his platoon's progress. On his own initiative, he made his way to a point ten paces from the hostile position, and killed the enemy machine gunner. Immediately, the enemy assistant gunner opened fire in the direction of Private First Class Moto. Crawling to the rear of the position, Private First Class Moto surprised the enemy soldier, who quickly surrendered. Taking his prisoner with him, Private First Class Moto took a position a few yards from a house to prevent the enemy from using the building as an observation post. While guarding the house and his prisoner, he observed an enemy machine gun team moving into position. He engaged them, and with deadly fire forced the enemy to withdraw. An enemy sniper located in another house fired at Private First Class Moto, severely wounding him. Applying first aid to his wound, he changed position to elude the sniper fire and to advance. Finally relieved of his position, he made his way to the rear for treatment. Crossing a road, he spotted an enemy machine gun nest. Opening fire, he wounded two of the three soldiers occupying the position. Not satisfied with this accomplishment, he then crawled forward to a better position and ordered the enemy soldier to surrender. Receiving no answer, Private First Class Moto fired at the position, and the soldiers surrendered. Private First Class Moto's extraordinary heroism and devotion to duty are in keeping with the highest traditions of military service and reflect great credit on him, his unit, and the United States Army.

See also
List of Asian American Medal of Honor recipients
List of Medal of Honor recipients for World War II

References

External links 
 "Army Secretary Lionizes 22 World War II Heroes" at Defense.gov
 

1917 births
1992 deaths
United States Army personnel of World War II
United States Army Medal of Honor recipients
People from Hawaii
United States Army soldiers
American military personnel of Japanese descent
Recipients of the Distinguished Service Cross (United States)
World War II recipients of the Medal of Honor
Burials in the National Memorial Cemetery of the Pacific